Than Than Gopal is a 2015 Marathi film directed by Kartik Shetty and features Vivek Chabukswar. This film is produced by Om Ganesh Production and the Mahurat of the film featured actor Akshay Kumar.

Cast
 Milind Gunaji
 Milind Gawali
 Vivek Chabukswar
Suzanne Bernert

Production
Shooting of the film began 30 May 2014 in Warli Village Valwanda near Jawahar. The team also shot in locations across Mumbai.

Reception 
A critic from Zee Talkies wrote that "The film does well overall and is worth the watch. The performances deserve to be seen, but the theme itself deserves plaudits".

References

List of Marathi films of 2015

2010s Marathi-language films
2015 films